Kivijärvi Airfield is an airfield in Kivijärvi, Finland, about  northeast of Kivijärvi centre.

See also
List of airports in Finland

References

External links
 VFR Suomi/Finland – Kivijärvi Airfield
 Lentopaikat.net – Kivijärvi Airfield 

Airports in Finland
Airfield
Buildings and structures in Central Finland